Lewis Allen or Lewis Allan may refer to:

Lewis Allen
Lewis Allen (rugby union) (1870–1932), New Zealand rugby union player
Frederick Lewis Allen (1890–1954), American editor and historian
Lewis Allen (director) (1905–2000), film and television director
Lewis F. Allen (1800–1890), American politician and land developer
Lewis M. Allen (1922–2003), American film producer

Lewis Allan
Lewis Allan (sometimes misspelled Lewis Allen), pseudonym of Abel Meeropol (1903–1986), American lyricist
Lewis Allan (footballer) (born 1996), Scottish footballer

See also
 Alan Lewis (disambiguation) 
 Allen Lewis (disambiguation)
 Allan Lewis (disambiguation)
 Alun Lewis (disambiguation)